Die erste Walpurgisnacht (The First Walpurgis Night) is a poem by Johann Wolfgang von Goethe, telling of the attempts of Druids in the Harz mountains to practice their pagan rituals in the face of new and dominating Christian forces.

It was famously set to music by Felix Mendelssohn as a secular cantata for soloists (alto, tenor, baritone, bass), choir, and orchestra. He completed an initial version in 1831, and extensively revised it before publishing it as his Opus 60 in 1843.

The composition consists of ten movements, including the programmatic overture, lasting about 36 minutes:

Ouvertüre: Das schlechte Wetter – Der Übergang zum Frühling (Overture: Bad weather – Transition to Spring)
 "Es lacht der Mai" (May is in full bloom):  tenor & chorus of Druids & people.
 "Könnt ihr so verwegen handeln?" (Could you be so rash, so daring?): alto, old woman, & chorus of wives of the people.
 "Wer Opfer heut zu bringen scheut" (Whoever fears to sacrifice): baritone, priest, & chorus of Druids.
 "Verteilt euch, wackre Männer, hier" (Divide your forces, valiant men): chorus of Druid watchmen.
 "Diese dummen Pfaffenchristen" (Christians and their priests are witless): bass, watchman, & chorus of watchmen.
 "Kommt mit Zacken und mit Gabeln" (Come with prongs and pitchforks):  chorus of Druids and people.
 "So weit gebracht, dass wir bei Nacht" (It's come so far that now by night): baritone, priest, & chorus of Druids and people.
 "Hilf, ach hilf mir, Kriegsgeselle" (Help, oh help me, comrade): tenor & chorus of Christian watchmen.
 "Die Flamme reinigt sich vom Rauch" (The flame cleanses itself of smoke): baritone, priest, & chorus of Druids and people.

Goethe wrote this text to be set to music, intending it for his friend Carl Friedrich Zelter, who tried twice, in 1799 and 1812, but did not complete a setting.  Mendelssohn, who knew Goethe, first took it up in 1830 and it was first performed in Berlin on 10 January 1833.

The story is about how a prank allows for a local tradition to take place in spite of opposition from an intolerant new regime.  The Druids and local heathen would celebrate May Day, but, as a women's chorus warns, this is now forbidden.  The Druid priests counter that those who fear to sacrifice deserve their chains.  A comic solution emerges as a Druid watchman suggests a masquerade of the Devil, spirits, and demons to frighten the occupying Christians.  The Christians are scared away, and the Druids and heathen are left to celebrate Spring and the Sun.

The attractions of this text for Mendelssohn likely were the ghost scene (compare his incidental music to A Midsummer Night's Dream) and the triumph (by guile) of an oppressed group in an occupied land, an important Enlightenment idea, as well as one perhaps reflecting the composer's Jewish background: the final verses of the oratorio emphasize an abstract divinity ("dein Licht") over a threatened earthly ritual ("den alten Brauch"). According to Melvin Berger, Mendelssohn was raised a Protestant but "was never fully accepted as a Christian by his contemporaries, nor was he ever fully cut off from his Judaic heritage." Consequently,

Recordings
 1952, Igor Markevitch, Vienna Symphony, Wiener Singakademie, Sieglinde Wagner (alto), Anton Dermota (tenor), Otto Edelmann (bass)
 1969, Frederic Waldman, Musica Aeterna Orchestra & Chorus, Lili Chookasian (alto), Ernst Haefliger (tenor), Hermann Prey (baritone), Raymond Michalski (bass)
 1974, Kurt Masur, Leipzig Gewandhaus Orchestra, Rundfunkchor Leipzig, Annelies Burmeister (alto), Eberhard Büchner (tenor), Siegfried Lorenz (baritone), Siegfried Vogel (bass)
 1978, Christoph von Dohnányi, Vienna Philharmonic, Wiener Singverein, Margarita Lilowa (alto), Horst Laubenthal (tenor), Tom Krause (baritone), Alfred Šramek (bass)
 1990, Michel Corboz, Gulbenkian Orchestra, Gulbenkian Choir, Brigitte Balleys (alto), Frieder Lang (tenor), Gilles Cachemaille (baritone) 
 1993, Francesco D'Avalos, Philharmonia Orchestra, Philharmonia Chorus, Jean Rigby (alto), Robert Tear (tenor), Anthony Michaels-Moore (baritone), Richard Van Allan (bass)
 1997, Claus Peter Flor, Bamberg Symphony Orchestra and Choir, Jadwiga Rappé (alto), Deon van der Walt (tenor), Anton Scharinger (baritone), Matthias Hölle (bass)
 2016, Douglas Boyd, Orchester Musikkollegium Winterthur, Zürcher Sing-Akademie, Birgit Remmert (alto), Jörg Dürmüller (tenor), Ruben Drole (baritone), Reinhard Mayr (bass)

Notes

Sources

External links

"Die erste Walpurgisnacht", chapter 113 in Johann Wolfgang von Goethe: Gedichte., Artemis (1949)

Poetry by Johann Wolfgang von Goethe
Cantatas
Compositions by Felix Mendelssohn
1831 compositions
1843 compositions
Walpurgis Night fiction